Soha is a village of Haripur District in the Khyber Pakhtunkhwa province of Pakistan. It is part of Beer Union Council and is located at 34°8'0N 72°58'0E with an altitude of 495 metres (1627 feet).

References

Populated places in Haripur District